Orientation: A Scientology Information Film is a 1996 short film shown by the Church of Scientology to people before they attend their first Scientology service. In some places, a confidentiality agreement must be signed before watching it.

It was produced by the Church's Golden Era Productions and, like all Scientology instructional films, is based on a screenplay originally written by Scientology founder L. Ron Hubbard.

The film is hosted by Larry Anderson (who left the church in 2009), and includes uncredited testimonials by Scientologists Kirstie Alley, Anne Archer, Chick Corea, Isaac Hayes, and John Travolta, identified only by their occupations.

In the film's final scene, Anderson says,

References

External links
 Archived version of official website
 
 Article at Film Threat

1996 films
Films about religion
1996 short films
Scientology media
1990s English-language films